Mamady Alex Bangré (born 15 June 2001) is a professional footballer who plays as a winger for  club Quevilly-Rouen, on loan from Toulouse. Born in France, he plays for the Burkina Faso national team.

Club career
Bangré joined the youth academy of Toulouse at the age of 6. On 10 April 2021, he signed his first professional contract with Toulouse. He made his professional debut with the team in a 1–0 Ligue 2 win over Châteauroux on 10 April 2021.

On 27 June 2022, Bangré joined Quevilly-Rouen on a season-long loan.

International career
Born in France, Bangré is of Burkinabé descent. He debuted with the Burkina Faso national team in a friendly 5–0 loss to Kosovo on 24 March 2022.

Personal life
Bangré's brother, Cheikh, is a semi-pro footballer who also came out of Toulouse's academy.

Honours 
Toulouse

 Ligue 2: 2021–22

References

External links
 
 Toulouse FC Profile

2001 births
Living people
Footballers from Toulouse
Burkinabé footballers
Burkina Faso international footballers
French footballers
Black French sportspeople
French sportspeople of Burkinabé descent
Sportspeople of Burkinabé descent
Toulouse FC players
US Quevilly-Rouen Métropole players
Ligue 2 players
Championnat National 3 players
Association football wingers